Carbamic acid, which might also be called aminoformic acid or aminocarboxylic acid, is the chemical compound with the formula . It can be obtained by the reaction of ammonia  and carbon dioxide  at very low temperatures, which also yields ammonium carbamate . The compound is stable only up to about 250 K (−23 °C); at higher temperatures it decomposes into those two gases. The solid apparently consists of dimers, with the two molecules connected by hydrogen bonds between the two carboxyl groups –COOH.

Carbamic acid could be seen as both an amine and carboxylic acid, and therefore an amino acid; however, the attachment of the carboxyl group –COOH directly to the nitrogen atom (without any intermediate carbon chain) makes it behave very differently from the amino acids with intermediate carbon chain. (Glycine  is generally considered to be the simplest amino acid.) The hydroxyl group –OH attached to the carbon also excludes it from the amide class.

The term "carbamic acid" is also used generically for any compounds of the form RR′NCOOH, where R and R′ are organic groups or hydrogen.

Deprotonation of a carbamic acid yields a carbamate anion , the salts of which can be relatively stable. Carbamate is also a term used for esters of carbamic acids, such as methyl carbamate . The carbamoyl functional group RR′N–C(=O)– (often denoted by Cbm) is the carbamic acid molecule minus the OH part of the carboxyl.

Structure
Carbamic acid is a planar molecule.

The  group of carbamic acid, unlike that of most amines, cannot be protonated to an ammonium group . The zwitterionic form  is very unstable and promptly decomposes into ammonia and carbon dioxide, yet there is a report of its detection in ices irradiated with high-energy protons.

Derivatives
Carbamic acid is formally the parent compound of several important families of organic compounds:

Carbamic acids
Many substituted carbamic acids (RHNCOOH or RR′NCOOH), can be readily synthesized by bubbling carbon dioxide through solutions of the corresponding amine ( or RR′NH, respectively) in an appropriate solvent, such as DMSO or supercritical carbon dioxide. These carbamic acids are generally unstable at room temperature, reverting to the parent amine and carbon dioxide.

Carbamate esters
Unlike carbamic acids, carbamate esters are generally stable at room temperature. They are prepared by reaction of carbamoyl chlorides with alcohols, the addition of alcohols to isocyanates, and the reaction of carbonate esters with ammonia. Methyl carbamate and ethyl carbamate are among the simplest examples and have historically been used in the textile industry, both are now suspected carcinogens. Benzyl carbamate is also known.

Occurrence in nature
The enzyme carbamate kinase, involved in several metabolic pathways of living organisms, catalyzes the formation of carbamoyl phosphate :

The resulting compound is called carbaminohaemoglobin.

Uses

Industrial
Carbamic acid is an intermediate in the industrial production of urea, which involves the reaction of carbon dioxide and ammonia.

Medical
Some carbamate esters have use as muscle relaxants, including Emylcamate, Phenprobamate, Styramate and other members of ATC code M03BA. These bind to the barbiturate site of the GABAA receptor.

Insecticides
Several carbamic acid based insecticides have been developed; for example aldicarb, carbaryl, carbofuran.

Chemical synthesis
An amine functional group  can be protected from unwanted reactions by being formed as carbamate ester residue –NHC(=O)–OR. Hydrolysis of the ester bond then produces a carbamic acid –NHC(=O)OH, which then loses carbon dioxide yielding the desired amine.

References

Carbamates